Al Falayah fort is an 18th-century fort in Ras Al Khaimah, United Arab Emirates (UAE). Traditionally the summer residence of the ruling Al Qasimi family, the fort was used as a rest house.

The landmark 1820 Treaty of Maritime Peace was signed at Al Falayah by Rashid bin Hamid Al Nuaimi, Ruler of Ajman and Abdulla Bin Rashid Al Mualla, Ruler of Umm Al Quwain on 15 March 1820.

The treaty had earlier been signed at mid-day on 8 January 1820 in Ras Al Khaimah by Major-General William Keir Grant together with Hassan Bin Rahmah Sheikh of 'Hatt and Falna' (hatt being modern day Khatt) and Rajib bin Ahmed Al-Zaabi, Sheikh of 'Jourat al Kamra' (Jazirat Al Hamra). A translation was prepared by Captain JP Thompson.

The treaty was then signed on 11 January 1820 in Ras Al Khaimah by Sheikh Shakbout of 'Aboo Dhebbee' (Abu Dhabi) and on 15 January by Hassan bin Ali, Sheikh of 'Zyah'.at Sharjah on 28 January 1820 by Saeed bin Saif on behalf of the Ruler of Dubai, Mohammed bin Haza bin Zaal, who was in his minority and then on 4 February 1820 by Sultan bin Saqr Al Qasimi, Ruler both of Sharjah and Ras Al Khaimah. The Falayah signatories completed the complement of Trucial Sheikhs.

The treaty was to lead to the recognition by the British of the Trucial States, to a series of further treaties formalising the British Protectorate over the UAE and eventually to the process leading to the formation of the modern United Arab Emirates on 2 December 1971.

References 

Forts in the United Arab Emirates
History of the United Arab Emirates